, there are over 52,011 known variable stars, with more being discovered regularly, so a complete list of every single variable is impossible at this place (cf. GCVS).  The following is a list of variable stars that are well-known, bright, significant, or otherwise interesting.

{| class="wikitable sortable" style="font-size:90%;"
|- bgcolor="#efefef"
! width="10%"|Designation (name)
! width="10%"|Constellation
! width="15%"|Discovery
! width="8%"|Apparent magnitude (Maximum)
! width="8%"|Apparent magnitude (Minimum)
! width="8%"|Range of magnitude
! width="11%"|Period
! width="15%"|Type
! width="15%"|Comment
|---
| R And
| Andromeda
|  
| 5m.8
| 14m.9
| 
|  d
| Mira variable (M)
|  
|---
| S And (Supernova 1885)
| Andromeda
| Ernst Hartwig, August 20, 1885
| 5m.8
| 16m
| 
| 
| Supernova (SNI)
|  
|---
| U Ant
| Antlia
|  
| 8m.1 (p)
| 9m.7 (p)
| 
| 
| LB
|  
|---
| θ Aps
| Apus
|  
| 6m.4 (p)
| 8m.6 (p)
| 
|  d
| Semiregular (SRB)
|  
|---
| η Aql
| Aquila
| Pigott, 1784
| 3m.48
| 4m.39
| 
|  d
| Classical Cepheid (DCEP)
|  
|---
| R Aql
| Aquila
|  
| 5m.5
| 12m.0
| 
|  d
| Mira variable (M)
|  
|---
| V Aql
| Aquila
|  
| 6m.6
| 8m.4
| 
|  d
| Semiregular (SRB)
|  
|---
| R Aqr
| Aquarius
| Karl Ludwig Harding, 1810
| 5m.8
| 12m.4
| 
|  d
| Mira variable (M)
|  
|---
| T Aqr
| Aquarius
|  
| 7m.2
| 14m.2
| 
|  d
| Mira variable (M)
|  
|---
| U Ara
| Ara
|  
| 7m.7
| 14m.1
| 
|  d
| Mira variable (M)
|  
|---
| R Ari
| Aries
|  
| 7m.4
| 13m.7
| 
|  d
| Mira variable (M)
|  
|---
| U Ari
| Aries
|  
| 7m.2
| 15m.2
| 
|  d
| Mira variable (M)
|  
|---
| ε Aur (Almaaz)
| Auriga
| Johann Heinrich Fritsch, 1821
| 2m.92
| 3m.83
| 
| 27.08 years
| Eclipsing binary Algol type (EA/GS)
|  
|---
| R Aur
| Auriga
|  
| 6m.7
| 13m.9
| 
|  d
| Mira variable (M)
|  
|---
| AE Aur
| Auriga
|  
| 5m.78
| 6m.08
| 
| 
| Orion variable (INA)
|  
|---
| R Boo
| Boötes
|  
| 6m.2
| 13m.1
| 
|  d
| Mira variable (M)
|  
|---
| W Boo
| Boötes
|  
| 4m.73
| 5m.4
| 
|  d
| Semiregular (SRB:)
|  
|---
| X Cam
| Camelopardalis
|  
| 7m.4
| 14m.2
| 
|  d
| Mira variable (M)
|  
|---
| VZ Cam
| Camelopardalis
|  
| 4m.80
| 4m.96
| 
|  d
| Semiregular (SR)
|  
|---
| R Cap
| Capricornus
| Hind, 1848
| 9m.4
| 14m.9
| 
|  d
| Mira variable (M)
|  
|---
| η Car
| Carina
| Burchell, 1827
| -0m.8
| 7m.9
| 
| 
| S Doradus (SDOR)
| "The unpredictable supergiant"
|---
| l Car
| Carina
|  
| 3m.28
| 4m.18
| 
|  d
| Classical Cepheid (DCEP)
|  
|---
| R Car
| Carina
|  
| 3m.9
| 10m.5
| 
|  d
| Mira variable (M)
|  
|---
| S Car
| Carina
|  
| 4m.5
| 9m.9
| 
|  d
| Mira variable (M)
|  
|---
| γ Cas
| Cassiopeia
|  
| 1m.6
| 3m.0
| 
| 
| Gamma Cassiopeiae (GCAS)
|  
|---
| R Cas
| Cassiopeia
|  
| 4m.7
| 13m.5
| 
|  d
| Mira variable (M)
|  
|---
| S Cas
| Cassiopeia
|  
| 7m.9
| 16m.1
| 
|  d
| Mira variable (M)
|  
|---
| W Cas
| Cassiopeia
|  
| 7m.8
| 12m.5
| 
|  d
| Mira variable (M)
|  
|---
| WZ Cas
| Cassiopeia
|  
| 6m.3
| 8m.5
| 
| 
| Semiregular (SRB)
| Visual double star, visible through binoculars
|---

| R Cen
| Centaurus
|  
| 5m.3
| 11m.8
| 
|  d
| Mira variable (M)
|  
|---
| S Cen
| Centaurus
|  
| 9m.2 (p)
| 10m.7 (p)
| 
|  d
| Semiregular (SR)
|  
|---
| T Cen
| Centaurus
|  
| 5m.5
| 9m.0
| 
|  d
| Semiregular (SRA)
|  
|---
| V645 Cen (Proxima Centauri)
| Centaurus
|  
| 12m.1 (B)
| 13m.12 (B)
| 
| 
| UV Ceti (UV)
|  
|---
| δ Cep
| Cepheus
| John Goodricke, 1784
| 3m.48
| 4m.37
| 
|  d
| Classical Cepheid (DCEP) prototype
| double star, visible in binoculars
|---
| μ Cep (Herschel's Garnet Star)
| Cepheus
| William Herschel, 1782
| 3m.43
| 5m.1
| 
|  d
| Semiregular (SRC)
|  
|---
| S Cep
| Cepheus
|  
| 7m.4
| 12m.9
| 
|  d
| Mira variable (M)
|  
|---
| T Cep
| Cepheus
|  
| 5m.2
| 11m.3
| 
|  d
| Mira variable (M)
|  
|---
| U Cep
| Cepheus
|  
| 6m.75
| 9m.24
| 
|  d
| Eclipsing binary Algol type (EA/SD)
|  
|---
| SS Cep
| Cepheus
|  
| 8m.0 (p)
| 9m.1 (p)
| 
|  d
| Semiregular (SRB)
|  
|---
| AR Cep
| Cepheus
|  
| 7m.0
| 7m.9
| 
| 
| Semiregular (SRB)
|  
|---
| ο Cet (Mira)
| Cetus
| David Fabricius, 1596; variability may have been first noted by Johannes Fokkes Holwarda, 1638
| 2m.0
| 10m.1
| 
|  d
| Mira variable (M)
| "The miraculous"  The first discovered non-ephemeral/cataclysmic variable star.
|---
| T Cet
| Cetus
|  
| 5m.0
| 6m.9
| 
|  d
| Semiregular (SRC)
|  
|---
| U Cet
| Cetus
|  
| 6m.8
| 13m.4
| 
|  d
| Mira variable (M)
|  
|---
| W Cet
| Cetus
|  
| 7m.1
| 14m.8
| 
|  d
| Mira variable (M)
|  
|---
| R Cha
| Chamaeleon
|  
| 7m.5
| 14m.2
| 
|  d
| Mira variable (M)
|  
|---
| R CMa
| Canis Major
|  
| 5m.70
| 6m.34
| 
|  d
| Eclipsing binary Algol type (EA/SD)
|  
|---
| VY CMa
| Canis Major
|  
| 6m.5
| 9m.6
| 
| 
| unique (*)
|  
|---
| FW CMa
| Canis Major
|  
| 5m.00
| 5m.50
| 
| 
| Gamma Cassiopeiae (GCAS)
|  
|---
| S CMi
| Canis Minor
|  
| 6m.6
| 13m.2
| 
|  d
| Mira variable (M)
|  
|---
| R Cnc
| Cancer
|  
| 6m.07
| 11m.8
| 
|  d
| Mira variable (M)
|  
|---
| S Cnc
| Cancer
| Hind, 1848
| 8m.29
| 10m.25
| 
|  d
| Eclipsing binary Algol type (EA/DS)
|  
|---
| T Cnc
| Cancer
| Hind, 1850
| 7m.6
| 10m.5
| 
|  d
| Semiregular (SRB)
|  
|---
| X Cnc
| Cancer
|  
| 5m.6
| 7m.5
| 
|  d
| Semiregular (SRB)
|  
|---
| T Col
| Columba
|  
| 6m.6
| 12m.7
| 
|  d
| Mira variable (M)
|  
|---
| R Com
| Coma Berenices
|  
| 7m.1
| 14m.6
| 
|  d
| Mira variable (M)
|  
|---
| α CrB (Alphecca or Gemma)
| Corona Borealis
|  
| 2m.21 (B)
| 2m.32 (B)
| 
|  d
| Eclipsing binary Algol type (EA/DM)
|  
|---
| R CrB
| Corona Borealis
| Piggott, 1795
| 5m.71
| 14m.8
| 
| 
| R Coronae Borealis (RCB)
|  
|---
| S CrB
| Corona Borealis
|  
| 5m.8
| 14m.1
| 
|  d
| Mira variable (M)
|  
|---
| T CrB
| Corona Borealis
|  
| 2m.0
| 10m.8
| 
| (80 years)
| recurrent nova (NR)
|  
|---
| U CrB
| Corona Borealis
|  
| 7m.66
| 8m.79
| 
|  d
| Eclipsing binary Algol type (EA/SD)
|  
|---
| V CrB
| Corona Borealis
|  
| 6m.9
| 12m.6
| 
|  d
| Mira variable (M)
|  
|---
| W CrB
| Corona Borealis
|  
| 7m.8
| 14m.3
| 
|  d
| Mira variable (M)
|  
|---
| R Cru
| Crux
|  
| 6m.40
| 7m.23
| 
|  d
| Classical Cepheid (DCEP)
|  
|---
| R Crv
| Corvus
|  
| 6m.7
| 14m.4
| 
|  d
| Mira variable (M)
|  
|---
| χ Cyg
| Cygnus
| Kirch, 1686
| 3m.3
| 14m.2
| 
|  d
| Mira variable (M)
|  
|---
| R Cyg
| Cygnus
|  
| 6m.1
| 14m.4
| 
|  d
| Mira variable (M)
|  
|---
| U Cyg
| Cygnus
|  
| 5m.9
| 12m.1
| 
|  d
| Mira variable (M)
|  
|---
| W Cyg
| Cygnus
|  
| 6m.80 (B)
| 8m.9 (B)
| 
|  d
| Semiregular (SRB)
|  
|---
| X Cyg
| Cygnus
|  
| 5m.85
| 6m.91
| 
|  d
| Classical Cepheid (DCEP)
|  
|---
| RT Cyg
| Cygnus
|  
| 6m.0
| 13m.1
| 
|  d
| Mira variable (M)
|  
|---
| SS Cyg
| Cygnus
|  
| 7m.7
| 12m.4
| 
| (49.5 d)
| dwarf nova UGSS prototype
|  
|---
| SU Cyg
| Cygnus
|  
| 6m.44
| 7m.22
| 
|  d
| Classical Cepheid (DCEP)
|  
|---
| CH Cyg
| Cygnus
|  
| 5m.60
| 8m.49
| 
| 
| Z Andromedae (ZAND+SR)
|  
|---
| R Del
| Delphinus
|  
| 7m.6
| 13m.8
| 
|   d
| Mira variable (M)
|  
|---
| U Del
| Delphinus
|  
| 7m.6 (p)
| 8m.9 (p)
| 
|  d
| Semiregular (SRB)
|  
|---
| EU Del
| Delphinus
|  
| 5m.79
| 6m.9
| 
|  d
| Semiregular (SRB)
|  
|---
| β Dor
| Dorado
|  
| 3m.46
| 4m.08
| 
|  d
| Classical Cepheid (DCEP)
|  
|---
| S Dor
| Dorado
|  
| 8m.6 (B)
| 11m.5 (B)
| 
| 
| S Doradus (SDOR) (prototype)
| in the Large Magellanic Cloud
|---
| R Dra
| Draco
|  
| 6m.7
| 13m.2
| 
|  d
| Mira variable (M)
|  
|---
| T Eri
| Eridanus
|  
| 7m.2
| 13m.2
| 
|  d
| Mira variable (M)
|  
|---
| R For
| Fornax
|  
| 7m.5
| 13m.0
| 
|  d
| Mira variable (M)
|  
|---
| η Gem (Propus)
| Gemini
|  
| 3m.15
| 3m.9
| 
|  d
| Semiregular (SRA+EA)
|  
|---
| ζ Gem (Mekbuda)
| Gemini
|  
| 3m.62
| 4m.18
| 
|  d
| Classical Cepheid (DCEP)
|  
|---
| R Gem
| Gemini
| Hind, 1848
| 6m.0
| 14m.0
| 
|  d
| Mira variable (M)
|  
|---
| S Gem
| Gemini
| Hind, 1848
| 8m.0
| 14m.7
| 
|  d
| Mira variable (M)
|  
|---
| T Gem
| Gemini
| Hind, 1848
| 8m.0
| 15m.0
| 
|  d
| Mira variable (M)
|  
|---
| U Gem
| Gemini
|  
| 8m.2
| 14m.9
| 
| (105.2 d)
| dwarf nova (UGSS+E)
|  
|---
| S Gru
| Grus
|  
| 6m.0
| 15m.0
| 
|  d
| Mira variable (M)
|  
|---
| α Her (Rasalgethi)
| Hercules
| William Herschel, 1759
| 2m.74
| 4m.0
| 
| 
| Semiregular (SRC)
|  
|---
| g Her (30 Her)
| Hercules
|  
| 4m.3
| 6m.3
| 
|  d
| Semiregular (SRB)
|  
|---
| u Her (68 Her)
| Hercules
|  
| 4m.69
| 5m.37
| 
|  d
| Eclipsing binary Algol type (EA/SD)
|  
|---
| S Her
| Hercules
|  
| 6m.4
| 13m.8
| 
|  d
| Mira variable (M)
|  
|---
| U Her
| Hercules
|  
| 6m.4
| 13m.4
| 
|  d
| Mira variable (M)
|  
|---
| X Her
| Hercules
|  
| 7m.5 (p)
| 8m.6 (p)
| 
|  d
| Semiregular (SRB)
|  
|---
| R Hor
| Horologium
|  
| 4m.7
| 14m.3
| 
|  d
| Mira variable (M)
|  
|---
| U Hor
| Horologium
|  
| 7m.8 (p)
| 15m.1 (p)
| 
|  d
| Mira variable (M)
|  
|---
| R Hya
| Hydra
| Maraldi, 1704
| 3m.5
| 10m.9
| 
|  d
| Mira variable (M)
|  
|---
| S Hya
| Hydra
| Hind, 1848
| 7m.2
| 13m.3
| 
|  d
| Mira variable (M)
|  
|---
| U Hya
| Hydra
|  
| 7m.0 (B)
| 9m.4 (B)
| 
| ~450 d
| Semiregular (SRB)
|  
|---
| VW Hya
| Hydra
|  
| 10m.5
| 14m.1
| 
|  d
| Eclipsing binary Algol type (EA/SD)
|  
|---
| BL Lac
| Lacerta
|  
| 12m.4 (B)
| 17m.2 (B)
| 
| 
| BLLAC prototype
| originally thought to be a variable star, but later
discovered to be a blazar
|---
| R Leo
| Leo
| J.A. Koch, 1782
| 4m.4
| 11m.3
| 
|  d
| Mira variable (M)
|  
|---
| R Lep
| Lepus
|  
| 5m.5
| 11m.7
| 
|  d
| Mira variable (M)
| Hind's Crimson Star
|---
| RX Lep
| Lepus
|  
| 5m.0
| 7m.4
| 
| ~60 d
| Semiregular (SRB)
|  
|---
| R LMi
| Leo Minor
|  
| 6m.3
| 13m.2
| 
|  d
| Mira variable (M)
|  
|---
| RU Lup
| Lupus
|  
| 9m.6 (p)
| 13m.4 (p)
| 
| 
| Orion variable (INT)
|  
|---
| β Lyr (Sheliak)
| Lyra
| John Goodricke, 1784
| 3m.25
| 4m.36
| 
|  d
| Eclipsing binary Beta Lyrae type (prototype)
|  
|---
| R Lyr
| Lyra
|  
| 3m.88
| 5m.0
| 
| ~46 d
| Semiregular (SRB)
|  
|---
| RR Lyr
| Lyra
|  
| 7m.06
| 8m.12
| 
|  d
| RR Lyrae variable (prototype)
|  
|---
| U Mic
| Microscopium
|  
| 7m.0
| 14m.4
| 
|  d
| Mira variable (M)
|  
|---
| U Mon
| Monoceros
|  
| 6m.1 (p)
| 8m.8 (p)
| 
|  d
| RV Tauri variable (RVB)
|  
|---
| V Mon
| Monoceros
|  
| 6m.0
| 13m.9
| 
|  d
| Mira variable (M)
|  
|---
| R Nor
| Norma
|  
| 6m.5 (p)
| 13m.9 (p)
| 
|  d
| Mira variable (M)
|  
|---
| T Nor
| Norma
|  
| 6m.2
| 13m.6
| 
|  d
| Mira variable (M)
|  
|---
| R Oct
| Octans
|  
| 6m.4
| 13m.2
| 
|  d
| Mira variable (M)
|  
|---
| S Oct
| Octans
|  
| 7m.2
| 14m.0
| 
|  d
| Mira variable (M)
|  
|---
| V Oph
| Ophiuchus
|  
| 7m.3
| 11m.6
| 
|  d
| Mira variable (M)
|  
|---
| X Oph
| Ophiuchus
|  
| 5m.9
| 9m.2
| 
|  d
| Mira variable (M)
|  
|---
| RS Oph
| Ophiuchus
|  
| 4m.3
| 12m.5
| 
| 
| recurrent nova (NR)
|  
|---
| BF Oph
| Ophiuchus
|  
| 6m.93
| 7m.71
| 
|  d
| Classical Cepheid (DCEP)
|  
|---
| α Ori (Betelgeuse)
| Orion
| John Herschel, 1840
| 0m.0
| 1m.3
| 
| 6.39 years
| Semiregular (SRC)
|  
|---
| δ Ori (Mintaka)
| Orion
| John Herschel, 1834
| 2m.14
| 2m.26
| 
|  d
| Eclipsing binary Algol type (EA/DM)
|  
|---
| R Ori
| Orion
| Hind, 1848
| 9m.05
| 13m.4
| 
|  d
| Mira variable (M)
|  
|---
| U Ori
| Orion
|  
| 4m.8
| 13m.0
| 
|  d
| Mira variable (M)
|  
|---
| W Ori
| Orion
|  
| 8m.2 (p)
| 12m.4 (p)
| 
|  d
| Semiregular (SRB)
|  
|---
| VV Ori
| Orion
|  
| 5m.31
| 5m.66
| 
|  d
| Eclipsing binary Algol type (EA/KE:)
|  
|---
| CK Ori
| Orion
|  
| 5m.9
| 7m.1
| 
| ~120 d
| Semiregular (SR:)
|  
|---
| κ Pav
| Pavo
|  
| 3m.91
| 4m.78
| 
|  d
| Type II Cepheid (CW)
|  
|---
| S Pav
| Pavo
|  
| 6m.6
| 10m.4
| 
|  d
| Semiregular (SRA)
|  
|---
| β Peg (Scheat)
| Pegasus
| Schmidt, 1847
| 2m.31
| 2m.74
| 
| 
| LB
|  
|---
| ε Peg (Enif)
| Pegasus
| 
| 0m.7
| 3m.5
| 
| 
| LC
|  
|---
| R Peg
| Pegasus
| Hind, 1848
| 6m.9
| 13m.8
| 
|  d
| Mira variable (M)
|  
|---
| X Peg
| Pegasus
|  
| 8m.8
| 14m.4
| 
|  d
| Mira variable (M)
|  
|---
| β Per (Algol)
| Perseus
| Geminiano Montanari, 1669
| 2m.12
| 3m.39
| 
|  d
| Eclipsing binary Algol type (EA/SD) (prototype)
| The Demon Star
|---
| DY Persei
| Perseus
|
|
|
|
|
| R Coronae Borealis / DY Persei / (prototype)
|
|---
| φ Per
| Perseus
|  
| 3m.96
| 4m.11
| 
|  d
| Gamma Cassiopeiae (GCAS)
|  
|---
| ρ Per
| Perseus
|  
| 3m.30
| 4m.0
| 
| ~50 d
| Semiregular (SRB)
|  
|---
| X Per
| Perseus
|  
| 6m.03
| 7m.0
| 
| 
| Gamma Cassiopeiae (GCAS+XP)
|  
|---
| ζ Phe (Wurren)
| Phoenix
|  
| 3m.91
| 4m.42
| 
|  d
| Eclipsing binary Algol type (EA/DM)
|  
|---
| R Pic
| Pictor
|  
| 6m.35
| 10m.1
| 
|  d
| Semiregular (SR)
|  
|---
| R Psc
| Pisces
| Hind, 1850
| 7m.0
| 14m.8
| 
|  d
| Mira variable (M)
|  
|---
| TX Psc
| Pisces
|  
| 4m.79
| 5m.20
| 
| 
| LB
|  
|---
| L2 Pup
| Puppis
|  
| 2m.6
| 6m.2
| 
|  d
| Semiregular (SRB)
|  
|---
| RS Pup
| Puppis
|  
| 6m.52
| 7m.67
| 
|  d
| Classical Cepheid (DCEP)
|  
|---
| T Pyx
| Pyxis
|  
| 7m.0 (B)
| 15m.77 (B)
| 
| (20 years)
| recurrent nova (NR)
|  
|---
| S Scl
| Sculptor
|  
| 5m.5
| 13m.6
| 
|  d
| Mira variable (M)
|  
|---
| RR Sco
| Scorpius
|  
| 5m.0
| 12m.4
| 
|  d
| Mira variable (M)
|  
|---
| RS Sco
| Scorpius
|  
| 6m.2
| 13m.0
| 
|  d
| Mira variable (M)
|  
|---
| RT Sco
| Scorpius
|  
| 7m.0
| 15m.2
| 
|  d
| Mira variable (M)
|  
|---
| R Sct
| Scutum
| Pigott, 1795
| 4m.2
| 8m.6
| 
|  d
| RV Tauri variable (RVA)
|  
|---
| R Ser
| Serpens
| Harding, 1826
| 5m.16
| 14m.4
| 
|  d
| Mira variable (M)
|  
|---
| S Ser
| Serpens
| Harding, 1828
| 7m.0
| 14m.1
| 
|  d
| Mira variable (M)
|  
|---
| U Sge
| Sagitta
|  
| 6m.45
| 9m.28
| 
|  d
| Eclipsing binary Algol type (EA/SD)
|  
|---
| WZ Sge
| Sagitta
|  
| 7m.0 (B)
| 15m.53 (B)
| 
| (33 years)
| dwarf nova (UGSU+E+ZZ)
|  
|---
| RR Sgr
| Sagittarius
|  
| 5m.4
| 14m.0
| 
|  d
| Mira variable (M)
|  
|---
| R Sgr
| Sagittarius
|  
| 6m.7
| 12m.83
| 
|  d
| Mira variable (M)
|  
|---
| U Sgr
| Sagittarius(in M25)
|  
| 6m.28
| 7m.15
| 
|  d
| Classical Cepheid (DCEP)
|  
|---
| RT Sgr
| Sagittarius
|  
| 6m.0
| 14m.1
| 
|  d
| Mira variable (M)
|  
|---
| RU Sgr
| Sagittarius
|  
| 6m.0
| 13m.8
| 
|  d
| Mira variable (M)
|  
|---
| RY Sgr
| Sagittarius
|  
| 5m.8
| 14m.0
| 
| 
| R Coronae Borealis (RCB)
|  
|---
| VX Sgr
| Sagittarius
|  
| 6m.52
| 14m.0
| 
|  d
| Semiregular (SRC)
|  
|---
| λ Tau
| Taurus
| Baxendell, 1848
| 3m.37
| 3m.91
| 
|  d
| Eclipsing binary Algol type (EA/DM)
|  
|---
| R Tau
| Taurus
| Hind, 1849
| 7m.6
| 15m.8
| 
|  d
| Mira variable (M)
|  
|---
| T Tau
| Taurus
|  
| 9m.3
| 13m.5
| 
| 
| Orion variable (INT)
|  
|---
| SU Tau
| Taurus
|  
| 9m.1
| 16m.86
| 
| 
| R Coronae Borealis (RCB)
|  
|---
| R Tri
| Triangulum
|  
| 5m.4
| 12m.6
| 
|  d
| Mira variable (M)
|  
|---
| R UMa
| Ursa Major
|  
| 6m.5
| 13m.7
| 
|  d
| Mira variable (M)
|  
|---
| T UMa
| Ursa Major
|  
| 6m.6
| 13m.5
| 
|  d
| Mira variable (M)
|  
|---
| U UMa
| Ursa Major
|  
| 6m.20
| 6m.25
| 
| 
| -
|---
| W UMa
| Ursa Major
|  
| 7m.75
| 8m.48
| 
|  d
| Eclipsing binary W Ursae Majoris type (prototype)
|  
|  
|---
| Z UMa
| Ursa Major
|  
| 6m.2
| 9m.4
| 
|  d
| Semiregular (SRB)
|  
|---
| α UMi (Polaris)
| Ursa Minor
|  
| 1m.86
| 2m.13
| 
|  d
| Classical Cepheid (DCEPS)
|  
|---
| R Vir
| Virgo
| Harding, 1809
| 6m.1
| 12m.1
| 
|  d
| Mira variable (M)
|  
|---
| S Vir
| Virgo
|  
| 6m.3
| 13m.2
| 
|  d
| Mira variable (M)
|  
|}

Notes

References
David H. Levy, Observing variable stars : a guide for the beginner''
 General Catalogue of Variable Stars

See also

 Lists of astronomical objects
 Lists of stars
 List of semiregular variable stars
 List of stars that have unusual dimming periods

Variable